Ticozzi is an Italian surname. Notable people with the surname include:

Giovanni Ticozzi (1897–1958), Italian priest, educator, and ancient languages scholar
Stefano Ticozzi (1762–1836), Italian art historian

Italian-language surnames